Förstemann is a surname, likely of German origin. Notable people with the surname include:

Ernst Förstemann (1822-1906), German historian, mathematician, doctor of linguistics, and librarian
Robert Förstemann (born 1986), German track cyclist

See also
Forstmann